In algebraic geometry, a Dwork family is a one-parameter family of hypersurfaces depending on an integer n, studied by Bernard Dwork. Originally considered by Dwork in the context of local zeta-functions, such families have been shown to have relationships with mirror symmetry and extensions of the modularity theorem.

Definition
The Dwork family is given by the equations

for all .

References

Algebraic geometry